Éric Guirado (born 16 September 1968) is a French film director and writer born in Lyon, Rhône.

Career
Éric Guirado started his career as a journalist and his interest in social issues is apparent in the documentary-style of his story-telling. After producing for regional television in France, he directed his first feature film From Heaven (Quand Tu Descendras Du Ciel) in 2003. His most successful film in his home country has been The Grocer's Son (Le Fils de L'Épicier), a dramatic film set in Provence, France. The film was presented as part of the 2007 Namur Francophone Film Festival.

Filmography

External links

 
 
Review: Le fils de l'épicier (The Grocer's Son) European Films

César Award winners
French film directors
Mass media people from Lyon
1968 births
Living people